Asier Ormazábal Larizgoitia (born 21 October 1982) is a Spanish footballer who plays for Santutxu FC as a right back.

Club career
Born in Bilbao, Biscay, Ormazábal finished his graduation with Athletic Bilbao's youth setup, Lezama, and made his senior debuts with the farm team in the 2001–02 season, in Tercera División. One year later he was promoted to the reserves in Segunda División B and, on 2 July 2005, made his official debut with the main side, starting in a 0–1 away loss to CFR Cluj for the UEFA Intertoto Cup.

In January 2006 Ormazábal rescinded his link with Athletic, and went on to resume his career in the third level, representing Pontevedra CF (two stints), FC Cartagena, CD Puertollano, UD Logroñés and SD Leioa.

References

External links

1982 births
Living people
Spanish footballers
Footballers from Bilbao
Association football defenders
Segunda División B players
Tercera División players
CD Basconia footballers
Bilbao Athletic footballers
Athletic Bilbao footballers
Pontevedra CF footballers
FC Cartagena footballers
CD Puertollano footballers
UD Logroñés players
SD Leioa players
Santutxu FC players